Alison Baker (born August 6, 1964) is a retired female racewalker from Canada. She set her personal best in the women's 10 km race walk event (47:20) at the 1993 World Championships.

Achievements

References

thecgf

External links
 
 
 

1964 births
Living people
Canadian female racewalkers
Athletes (track and field) at the 1990 Commonwealth Games
Athletes (track and field) at the 1994 Commonwealth Games
Commonwealth Games competitors for Canada
World Athletics Championships athletes for Canada